Robert H. Elrod (March 15, 1926 – December 17, 2017) was an American former politician in the state of Florida.

Elrod was born in Henryville, Indiana and came to Florida in 1960. He is an alumnus of Purdue University and was a citrus grower and advertising agency owner. Elrod served in the Florida House of Representatives from 1963 to 1966, as a Republican, representing the Orange County.

References

2017 deaths
1926 births
Republican Party members of the Florida House of Representatives